Ha was a possible queen of Ancient Egypt in the Naqada III or Predynastic Period, roughly 3150 to 3120 BC. She may have been married to King Ka.

Tomb and artifacts 

An inscription of Ha and Ka's serekhs were found inscribed on a jar from Ka's tomb in Umm El Qa'ab, Abydos, Egypt.

See also 
 Thinis

References
William Matthew Flinders Petrie (3 June 1853 – 28 July 1942) - A history of Egypt Published in 1894

Ancient Egyptian queens consort
32nd-century BC Egyptian people